Hypocalymma longifolium is a member of the family Myrtaceae endemic to Western Australia.

It blooms between August and September producing cream-white flowers.

It is found in a small area along the west coast in swamps or breakaways in the Mid West region of Western Australia centred around Northampton where it grows in sandy to clay soils.

References

longifolium
Endemic flora of Western Australia
Rosids of Western Australia
Critically endangered flora of Australia
Taxa named by Ferdinand von Mueller
Plants described in 1860